Margie is a feminine given name, usually a short form (hypocorism) of the related names Margaret, Marjorie, or Margarita, all of which mean "pearl".

Margie may refer to:

People 
 Margie Ackles (1939–2019), American retired figure skater
 Marjorie Margie Alexander (1948–2013), American gospel and soul singer
 Margie Velma Barfield (1932-1984), American serial killer
 Margie Bowes (1941–2020), American country music singer
 Margie Rasri Balenciaga Chirathiwat (born 1990), Thai actress and model
 Margie Day (1926–2014), stage name of Margaret Hoffler, American R&B singer
 Margaret Dingeldein (born 1980), American water polo player
 Margie Evans, American blues singer and songwriter born Marjorie Ann Johnson in 1940
 Margie Gillis (born 1953), Canadian dancer and choreographer
 Margie Goldstein-Engle (born 1958), American equestrian
 Margie Harrison, first Playboy Playmate of the Month (January and June 1954)
 Margaret Hart Ferraro (1913–2000), American burlesque strip tease artist better known as Margie Hart
 Margie Hendricks, an original member of The Raelettes American girl group of the 1950s to '90s
 Margaret Margie Hines, American voice actress who played Olive Oyl in the Popeye cartoons from 1939 to 1944
 Margarita Margie Holmes, Filipina psychologist and professor
 Marjorie Margie Hyams (1920-2012), American jazz vibraphonist, pianist and arranger
 Margaret Margie Joseph (born 1950), American R&B, soul and gospel singer
 Margie Liszt (1909–1992), American film and television actress
 Margaret Martin (bodybuilder) (born 1979), American professional bodybuilder
 Margaret Margie Masters (1934–2022), Australian LPGA golfer
 Margie Newton, a stage name of Italian actress Margit Evelyn Newton (born 1961)
 Margarita Moran-Floirendo (born 1973), Filipina peace advocate, 1973 Miss Universe and President of Ballet Philippines
 Margie Orford (born 1964), South African journalist, film director and fiction and non-fiction author
 Margie Palatini, American author of children's books
 Margaret Margie Profet (born 1958), American evolutionary biologist
 Margie Rayburn, American singer born Marjorie Helen Orwig (1924-2000)
 Margie Reiger, silent movie actress, star of Charlie Chaplin's 1915 short By the Sea
 Margie Ruddick, American landscape architect
 Margie Santimaria (born 1989), Italian professional triathlete
 Margie Singleton, stage name of American country music singer and songwriter Margaret Louis Ebey (born 1935)
 Margie Smith (born 1969), American curler
 Margie Stewart (1919–2012), American actress and the official United States Army poster girl during World War II
 Margie Sudre (born 1943), French politician
 Margie Wilcox, American politician elected to the Alabama House of Representatives in 2014
 Marjorie Margie Wright (born 1952), American retired Hall-of-Fame college softball head coach and former pitcher

Fictional characters 
 Margie Albright, title character of My Little Margie, a 1950s American television situation comedy series
 Margie, title character of Margie (1940 film), played by Nan Grey
 Margie Clayton, title character of Margie (TV series), a 1960s situation comedy starring Cynthia Pepper
 Marjorie "Margie" MacDuff, protagonist of Margie (1946 film), played by Jeanne Crain
 Margie Star, the wife of Herb Star and the mother of Sam and  Patrick in the animated TV series SpongeBob SquarePants
 Margie, an elephant villager from the video game series Animal Crossing

See also
 Margy
 Marji

Feminine given names
English feminine given names
Given names derived from gemstones
Hypocorisms